The Florida Statutes are the codified, statutory laws of Florida; it currently has 48 titles. A chapter in the Florida Statutes represents all of the relevant statutory law on a particular subject. The statutes are the selected reproduction of the portions of each session law, which are published in the Laws of Florida, that have general applicability.

While the legislature may create specific chapters, the Florida Office of Legislative Services' Division of Statutory Revision has the final authority to determine where the legislation will be codified and the location of the sections within the chapters. This is why some laws do not appear in the statutes where the bill identifies their placement.

Since 1999, the Florida Statutes have been published in their entirety annually. Before then they were published bi-annually following each odd-year regular session and a supplement was published following each even-year regular session.  The practice of publishing the Florida Statutes every other year was a relic of the time when the Florida Legislature, prior to 1969, met only in odd-numbered years.

See also
 Laws of Florida
 Law of Florida
 United States Code

Topics
 Capital punishment in Florida
 Felony murder rule (Florida)
 Gun laws in Florida
 LGBT rights in Florida
 Florida property law

References

External links
Florida Statutes from the Florida Legislature
Sunshine Statutes (Florida Statutes) from the Florida Society of News Editors and First Amendment Foundation
Florida Statutes from FindLaw

United States state legal codes